James "Radio" Kennedy (October 14, 1946 – December 15, 2019) was an American man with an intellectual disability who was known for his association with the T. L. Hanna High School football team in Anderson, South Carolina. He first gained prominence in 1996 when Gary Smith wrote an article about Kennedy for Sports Illustrated titled "Someone to Lean On." Kennedy's story was then made into a feature film in 2003 titled Radio in which he was portrayed by Cuba Gooding Jr.

Biography
James Robert Kennedy was born on October 14, 1946, in Anderson to parents Bill Kennedy and Janie Mae Bolden Greenlee. He had two brothers, George and Walter.

According to Sheila Hilton, the former principal of T.L. Hanna High, Kennedy earned the nickname "Radio" in the mid-1960s when he began to show up at the school football field with a transistor radio. In 1964, Kennedy befriended the high school's then football coach Harold Jones. Their friendship served as the basis of the 2003 film Radio starring Cuba Gooding Jr. as Kennedy and Ed Harris as Jones. In 1965, Kennedy became an unofficial 11th-grade student at T.L. Hanna High. Kennedy was considered a permanent high school junior, meaning that he would never graduate or have to leave.

Recognition 
In 2006, a statue of Kennedy was unveiled at the football stadium of T.L. Hanna High School. In 2016, Kennedy was inducted into the T.L. Hanna Athletic Hall of Fame.

Later years 
According to Jones, Kennedy had been treated for pancreatitis as well as diabetes and kidney issues. Kennedy died on December 15, 2019, in Anderson at the age of 73. At the time of his death, Kennedy was living with his brother George and niece Jackie.

References

1946 births
2019 deaths
People from Anderson, South Carolina
People with intellectual disability